Taihe is a town under the administration of Liangzihu District, Ezhou, Hubei, China. , it administers Taihe Residential Community and the following 21 villages:
Bohao Village
Chaoying Village
Chentai Village
Dongbianzhu Village
Hujin Village
Huahe Village
Huahuang Village
Jinli Village
Malong Village
Niushi Village
Nongke Village
Qiushan Village
Shanghong Village
Shizikou Village
Xiebu Village
Xinjian Village
Xinwu Village
Zitan Village
Kefan Village
Xincheng Village
Xiepei Village

References 

Township-level divisions of Hubei
Ezhou